The Board of Intermediate Education, Karachi (BIEK) is a government board in Karachi for intermediate education examination. It was established as a separate entity in 1974 through the "Sindh Boards of Intermediate and Secondary Education" amendment act No. 20 page 31 of the 1973 book of documentation. The current chairman of the Board is Prof. Dr. Saeeduddin. The Board has the power to organize, regulate, develop and control Intermediate Education. The Board of Secondary Education, Karachi has similar authorities for secondary education.

See also
 List of educational boards in Pakistan

References

External links
BIEK official website

1974 establishments in Pakistan
Education in Karachi
Education boards in Sindh
Organizations established in 1974